(Irish Legend) is a 1955 opera by Werner Egk who also wrote the libretto after the 1892/1899 verse drama The Countess Cathleen by W. B. Yeats. It premiered at the Salzburg Festival on 17 August 1955.

History 

 was the first opera that Egk composed after World War II. He was invited to compose an opera for the 1955 Salzburg Festival. The project was supported by Wilhelm Furtwängler. Egk wrote his own libretto based on The Countess Cathleen by Yeats which has elements of Irish mysticism from both heathen and Christian roots.

 was premiered at the Salzburg Festival on 17 August 1955, conducted by George Szell and directed by Oscar Fritz Schuh, with Inge Borkh and the young Walter Berry in leading roles. The premiere performance was broadcast by international radio stations. The premiere received international recognition. Egk revised the opera in 1975.

Plot 
Ireland suffers a famine. Two messengers of the devil, disguised as merchants, promise food to the hungry in return for selling their souls. Many despaired give in and end in hell. The countess Cathleen offers her soul to save the others. Egk explained that he liked the concept that one person could try, against all odds, to stand up for others in a seemingly hopeless situation.

Roles 

The story takes place in Ireland in legendary time.

Recording
 Inge Borkh, Kurt Böhme, Walter Berry, Max Lorenz, Gottlob Frick, Waldemar Kmentt, chorus of the Wiener Staatsoper, Wiener Philharmoniker, George Szell

References

External links 
 Irische Legende (in German) musirony.de

1955 operas
German-language operas
Operas by Werner Egk
Adaptations of works by W. B. Yeats
Operas based on plays